The Postmarks is an album by The Postmarks, released in 2007.

Track listing
"Goodbye" – 3:30
"Looks Like Rain" – 3:32
"Summers Never Seem to Last" – 3:12
"Winter Spring Summer Fall" – 3:34
"Watercolors" – 4:05
"Know Which Way the Wind Blows" – 4:59
"Weather the Weather" – 2:21
"Leaves" – 1:45
"Let Go" – 4:07
"You Drift Away" – 3:49
"The End of the Story" – 4:38

2007 albums
The Postmarks albums